Dalitchetna (Gujarati: દલિતચેતના) is a Gujarati language monthly magazine published on 13th of every month under the editorship of Manoj Parmar. The magazine was founded in 2006 with the purpose of the blooming of Gujarati Dalit literature.

History 
The first issue of the magazine was published on 13 November 2006 from Chandkheda, Gandhinagar. Later, it started to give prizes to the best story and best poem published during the year.

Content 
Dalitchetna publishes a variety of literary genres and articles based on Dalit literature including poems, short stories, criticism, research papers, and essays.

See also 
 Parivesh
 Shabdasrishti

References

External links
 

2006 establishments in Gujarat
Literary magazines published in India
Monthly magazines published in India
Magazines established in 2006
Gujarati-language magazines